The United States has formal diplomatic relations with most nations. This includes all UN member and observer states other than Bhutan, Iran, North Korea and Syria, and the UN observer State of Palestine, the last of which the U.S. does not recognize. Additionally, the U.S. has diplomatic relations with Kosovo and the European Union.

The United States federal statutes relating to foreign relations can be found in Title 22 of the United States Code. The United States has the most diplomatic posts of any state.

History

North and South America

Caribbean

Europe
American relations with Eastern Europe are influenced by the legacy of the Cold War. Since the collapse of the Soviet Union, former Communist-bloc states in Europe have gradually transitioned to democracy and capitalism. Many have also joined the European Union and NATO, strengthening economic ties with the broader Western world and gaining the military protection of the United States via the North Atlantic Treaty.

Africa

North Africa

Sub-Saharan Africa

Asia

West Asia and Middle East

The United States has many important allies in the Greater Middle East region. These allies are Turkey, Saudi Arabia, Morocco, Jordan, Afghanistan (formerly), Israel, Egypt, Kuwait, Bahrain and Qatar. Israel and Egypt are leading recipients of United States foreign aid, receiving $2.775 billion and 1.75 billion in 2010. Turkey is an ally of the United States through its membership in NATO, while all of the other countries except Saudi Arabia and Qatar are major non-NATO allies.

The United States toppled the government of Saddam Hussein during the 2003 invasion of Iraq. Turkey is host to approximately 90 B61 nuclear bombs at Incirlik Air Base. Other allies include Qatar, where 3,500 US troops are based, and Bahrain, where the United States Navy maintains NSA Bahrain, home of NAVCENT and the Fifth Fleet.

Central Asia

South Asia

East Asia

Southeast Asia
Many countries in the Association of Southeast Asian Nations (ASEAN) are important partners for United States in both economic and geostrategic aspects. ASEAN's geostrategic importance stems from many factors, including: the strategic location of member countries, the large shares of global trade that pass through regional waters, and the alliances and partnerships which the United States shares with ASEAN member states. In July 2009, the United States signed ASEAN's Treaty of Amity and Cooperation, which establishes guiding principles intended to build confidence among its signatories with the aim of maintaining regional peace and stability. Trade flows are robust and increasing between America and the ASEAN region.

Oceania

Countries with visa services suspended

Countries with no embassy

  (Since 2021 the U.S. Embassy has been operating out of Qatar. There is also a U.S. Interests Section at the Qatari Embassy in Kabul.)
  (the US ambassador to Spain is also accredited to Andorra; the US Consul General in Barcelona is responsible for day-to-day relations)
  (US embassy and consulates for Antigua and Barbuda are located in Barbados)
  (Contact is made via the Government of India at the US embassy in New Delhi.)
  (the US ambassador to Madagascar is also accredited to Comoros.)
  (US embassy and consulates for Dominica are located in Barbados)
  (US embassy and consulates for Grenada are located in Barbados)
  (Contact is made at the US embassy in Senegal and there is also a presence of the United States in Guinea-Bissau through a Liaison Office in Bissau and a virtual presence post online, there are currently no Guinea-Bissauan consulates for the US, except for a permanent mission to the UN in New York)
  (inactive, US Interests Section at the Swiss Embassy acts as a de facto embassy. Since December 2011, the US has also maintained a virtual embassy online.)
  (the US ambassador to Fiji is also accredited to Kiribati.)
  (the US ambassador to Switzerland is also accredited to Liechtenstein.)
  (the US ambassador to Sri Lanka is also accredited to Maldives.)
  (the US ambassador to France is also accredited to Monaco; the US Consul General in Marseilles is responsible for day-to-day relations.)
  (the US ambassador to Fiji is also accredited to Nauru.)
  (Contact is made via the government of Sweden through its embassy in Pyongyang)
  (US embassy and consulates for Saint Kitts and Nevis are located in Barbados)
  (US embassy and consulates for Saint Lucia are located in Barbados)
  (US embassy and consulates for Saint Vincent and the Grenadines are located in Barbados)
  (the US ambassador to New Zealand is also accredited to Samoa.)
  (the US ambassador to Italy is also accredited to San Marino; the US Consul General in Florence is responsible for day-to-day relations.)
  (the US ambassador to Gabon is also accredited to São Tomé and Príncipe.)
  (the US ambassador to Mauritius is also accredited to Seychelles.)
  (the US ambassador to Fiji is also accredited to Tonga.)
  (the US ambassador to Fiji is also accredited to Tuvalu.)
  (the US ambassador to Papua New Guinea is also accredited to Vanuatu.)
 other:  (UN observer state; the United States does not recognize the State of Palestine. The US was formerly represented through a consulate in Jerusalem accredited to the Palestinian Authority, which was merged with its Jerusalem embassy to Israel)

Unrecognized countries with no foreign relations with the United States
  (Georgian breakaway territory)
  (de facto independent state, legally part of Azerbaijan) (See: Artsakh–United States relations)
  (only recognized by Turkey) (See: Northern Cyprus–United States relations)
  (claimed by Morocco)
  (de facto independent state, legally part of Somalia) (See: Somaliland–United States relations)
  (Georgian breakaway territory)
  (de facto independent state, legally part of Moldova) (See: Transnistria–United States relations)

Sovereign entities with no diplomatic relations with the United States

Former countries
 Grand Duchy of Baden
 Kingdom of Bavaria
 Duchy of Brunswick-Lüneburg
 Federal Republic of Central America
 Greater Republic of Central America
 Congo Free State
 Czechoslovakia
 East Germany
 Republic of Genoa
 German Empire
 Kingdom of Hanover
 Hanseatic Republics
 Hawaiian Kingdom
 Grand Duchy of Hesse
 Mecklenburg-Schwerin
 Mecklenburg-Strelitz
 Duchy of Nassau
 North German Confederation
 Grand Duchy of Oldenburg
 Orange Free State
 Ottoman Empire
 Papal States
 Duchy of Parma
 Russian Empire
 Ryukyu Kingdom
 Kingdom of Sardinia
 Principality of Schaumburg-Lippe
 Soviet Union
 Republic of Texas
 Grand Duchy of Tuscany
 Kingdom of the Two Sicilies
 Kingdom of Württemberg
 Yugoslavia

See also
 Criticism of United States foreign policy
 East Asia–United States relations
 Emigration from the United States
 Foreign policy of the United States
 History of United States foreign policy
 Immigration to the United States
 List of diplomatic missions in the United States
 List of diplomatic missions of the United States
 Major non-NATO ally
 United States foreign aid
 Visa policy of the United States
 State Sponsors of Terrorism (U.S. list)

References

External links
 Guide to Countries, Office of the Historian, US Department of State